Didžiasalis is a village in Ignalina district municipality, in Utena County, North Eastern Lithuania. According to the 2011 census, the town has a population of 1299 people. The village is near the border with Belarus.

References

Ignalina District Municipality
Villages in Utena County